EZchip Semiconductor was a publicly traded fabless semiconductor company, headquartered in Yokneam, Israel, that developed and marketed Ethernet network processors. It was acquired by Mellanox Technologies in 2016.

History 
EZchip was co-founded in 1999 by Eli Fruchter, a Technion graduate in the field of electrical engineering and veteran of the Israel Defense Forces' 8200 intelligence unit, and Alex Tal who served as Ezchip's first  CTO and V.P R&D. Until 2008, EZchip operated as a subsidiary of LANOptics, then a developer of Ethernet switching chips and security software. After LANOptics completed its full acquisition of EZchip in January 2008, it changed its name to EZchip and its ticker symbol from LNOP to EZCH. Over the twelve-month period leading up to February 2012, shares of EZchip rose 40% on the Nasdaq index as demand for its processors grew and speculation increased that the company would get bought out.

In July 2014, EZchip  acquired Tilera, a company that develops high-performance multi-core processors, intelligent network interface cards and white-box appliances for data-center networking equipment, $130 million in cash.

In January 2016, a shareholder vote passed that approved the merger of Mellanox Technologies and EZchip. The acquisition was completed on 23 February 2016.

See also 
Silicon Wadi
 TA BlueTech Index
 List of Israeli companies quoted on the Nasdaq
Economy of Israel

References

Further reading 
 
 

Fabless semiconductor companies
Companies formerly listed on the Nasdaq
Companies listed on the Tel Aviv Stock Exchange
Electronics companies established in 1999
Semiconductor companies of Israel
Israeli companies established in 1999
Mergers and acquisitions of Israeli companies
2016 mergers and acquisitions